Karimnagar railway station (station code KRMR) is a railway station in Karimnagar District Headquarters. It serves the city of Karimnagar in  Telangana State, India. It comes under Secunderabad division of South Central Railway, opened in the year of 2001.

Overview 
It is a single broad-gauge line located between Peddapalli–Nizamabad railway section connected to the Grand Trunk Route (Delhi-Chennai line) at Peddapalli (35 kilometres). Its neighborhood station is  Kottapalli railway station. There is a new line of Kothapalli–Manoharabad, currently under construction.

History

Karimnagar railway station's construction started in 1994 on the sanction of Peddapalli–Nizamabad line by P. V. Narasimha Rao, 10th prime minister of India. Peddapalli–Karimnagar was laid between 1994 and 2001. Train service has been operational from 2001. Karimnagar–Jagityal line was completed in 2007. Train service from Karimnagar Jagityal  started in 2007. Karimnagar Peddapalli DEMU service started in 2001, it was later extended to Sirpur town. The Karimnagar Tirupati weekly express was inaugurated in October 2012; it received a good response, therefore the train frequency increased from weekly to biweekly in 2013. The Peddapalli-Nizamabad line was completed in 2017 providing direct access to Nizamabad from Karimnagar.

There is a railway line Manoharabad (near Secunderabad) to Kothapalli (Karimnagar) under construction, this Kothapalli-Manoharabad line has work that has been finished till Gajwel (Siddipet Dist). Work was slightly delayed due to Covid-19 lockdowns. 
On June 29, 2022, the under construction railway line received its first shipment of goods at the Gajwel stop. As of January 2023, the line is completed up until Kodakondla, with remaining distance to Kothapalli to be completed by 2025.

Originating and passing trains

 Tirupati–Karimnagar Superfast Express (12761) (Wed, Sat)
 Karimnagar–Tirupati Superfast Express (12762) (Sun, Thur)
 Karimnagar–Nizamabad DEMU (77260) (Sun, Mon, Wed, Thu, Sat)
 Nizamabad–Karimnagar DEMU (77259) (Sun, Mon, Tue, Thu, Fri)
 Karimnagar–Sirpur Town DEMU Daily (77255)
 Sirpur Town–Karimnagar DEMU Daily (77256)
 Jagityal–Peddapalli DEMU (77257) (Tue, Fri)
 Peddapalli–Jagityal DEMU (77258) (Tue, Fri)
 Kacheguda–Karimnagar Passenger Daily (57601)
 Karimnagar–Kacheguda Passenger Daily (57602)
 Lokmanya Tilak Terminus Mumbai–Karimnagar Superfast Express (11205) (Sat)
 Karimnagar–Lokmanya Tilak Terminus Mumbai Superfast Express (11206) (Sun)
 Karimnagar–Tirupathi special (02761) (mon, wed, fri) runs till 30 SEP 2019
 Tirupathi–Karimnager special (02761) (sun, tue, thu)

Gallery

See also
Peddapalli–Nizamabad section

Kothapalli-Manoharabad section

References

Railway stations in India opened in 2001
Secunderabad railway division
Railway stations in Karimnagar district